Lorenzo Portet (1870–1917) was a Spanish anarchist and an associate of anarchist and educational reformer Francesc Ferrer i Guàrdia).

Biography
Born in Catalonia in 1870, Portet was raised in Barcelona, Spain. He attended the University of Barcelona, then went to Buenos Aires, Argentina to teach. In 1895, after five years away, Portet returned to Spain and soon got involved in an insurrection. He fled to Paris where in 1896 he met Francesc Ferrer i Guàrdia, founder of the Escuela Moderna or Modern School movement. He returned to Barcelona to get information and report on the people being tortured in Montjuic after the 1896 Corpus Christi procession bombing in Barcelona. He then returned to Paris where he ran the publishing house Ferrer had established. After Ferrer was executed in 1909 following the events known as the Tragic Week, Portet led a mass demonstration in Paris in front of the Spanish embassy. Though Ferrer left him his house in Paris, his publishing house and stock in Barcelona, and shares in two companies to enable Portet to carry on Ferrer's work, Portet was arrested and expelled from France. Portet fled to Liverpool, England where he taught foreign languages.

Portet met American radical and fellow exile, Margaret Sanger, in a Liverpool café.

See also
 Margaret Sanger
 Modern School (United States)
 Escuela Moderna
 Francesc Ferrer i Guàrdia
 Anarchism

References

Further reading
 Avrich, Paul. The Modern School Movement: Anarchism and Education in the United States (Princeton University Press, 1980) 
 Constant, Leroy, Los Secretos del Anarquismo: Asesinato de Canalejas y el caso Ferrer. Mexico, 1913.
 Heath, Nick. Lorenzo Portet, 1870-1914
 Katz, Esther, Cathy Moran Hajo and Peter Engelman, eds. The Margaret Sanger Papers Microfilm Edition: Smith College Collections (University Publications of America, 1996)  
 Katz, Esther, Cathy Moran Hajo and Peter Engelman, eds. The Margaret Sanger Papers Microfilm Edition: Collected Documents Series (University Publications of America, 1997)
 Katz, Esther, Cathy Moran Hajo and Peter Engelman, eds. The Selected Papers of Margaret Sanger, vol 1: The Woman Rebel, 1900-1928. Urbana:University of Illinois Press, 2003. 

Spanish anarchists
1870 births
1917 deaths